Park and Shopmay mean:
Andronico's, once known as Park and Shop, a supermarket chain in the San Francisco Bay Area
Park and Shop in Washington, D.C., built in 1930, of the first two neighborhood shopping centers in the United States
ParknShop, a supermarket chain in Hong Kong
Park and Shop (game), a board game